A Little Love is the debut studio album by Hong Kong-based artist Fiona Fung, under the label Sony Music.

The album has two editions. The CD + DVD edition was released on 20 November 2008. It features three music videos and a video of Fiona's Tokyo trip. Another edition, in Blu-spec CD format, was subsequently released on 13 January 2010.

The records were pressed in Japan to ensure perfect sound quality.

Track listing

See also 
 Sweet Melody

External links 
 Sony Music - A Little Love
 Mojim.com - A Little Love lyrics
 YesAsia's professional review - A Little Love
 

2008 albums
Sony Music Hong Kong albums